Homebrew computer may refer to:

Homebuilt computer
Homebrew Computer Club